Swann House, a.k.a. Lyle House, is a historic high-rise building in Melbourne, Australia.

Location
The building is located at 22 on William Street in the Central Business District of Melbourne.

History
It was built in 1921 for the State Electricity Commission of Victoria, on the site where John Pascoe Fawkner's house previously stood. It was designed by architect Alfred Romeo La Gerche in the palazzo/classical style, with an Art Deco edge, though others have described the style as "commercial palazzo form with restrained Greek Revival detailing". The construction firm was Hansen & Yuncken.

Two decades later, in 1948–1949, two more floors were added at the top of the building. As such it is now twelve stories in height.

In 2014 it was purchased by the Orion Group.

References

Buildings and structures in Melbourne City Centre
Residential buildings completed in 1921
1921 establishments in Australia